Theodoros Iakovidis (born 12 February 1991) is a Greek Olympian weightlifter. He competed for Greece at the 2016 Summer Olympics and 2020 Summer Olympics.

Results

References

External links 
 
 
 

1991 births
Living people
Greek male weightlifters
Weightlifters at the 2016 Summer Olympics
Olympic weightlifters of Greece
Panathinaikos weighlifters
Mediterranean Games gold medalists for Greece
Mediterranean Games silver medalists for Greece
Mediterranean Games bronze medalists for Greece
Mediterranean Games medalists in weightlifting
Competitors at the 2013 Mediterranean Games
Competitors at the 2018 Mediterranean Games
Competitors at the 2022 Mediterranean Games
Weightlifters at the 2020 Summer Olympics
21st-century Greek people
Sportspeople from Athens